Kim Min-jeong (born 12 September 1996) is a South Korean footballer who plays as a goalkeeper for Incheon Red Angels and the South Korea national team.

International career
Kim played ten matches for the South Korea U20 team between 2015 and 2016 and was a member of the squad for the 2016 FIFA U-20 Women's World Cup. She made her full international debut on 7 June 2016 in a friendly match against Myanmar.

References

External links

1996 births
Living people
South Korean women's footballers
South Korea women's international footballers
2019 FIFA Women's World Cup players
WK League players
Women's association football goalkeepers